Karavitis is a surname. Notable people with the surname include:

Alekos Karavitis (1904–1975), Greek composer and singer
Ioannis Karavitis (1883–1949), Greek leader

Greek-language surnames